The Municipality of Sežana is a municipality in the Littoral region of Slovenia, near the Italian border. The seat of the municipality is the town of Sežana. The municipality was established on 6 November 1994, when the former Municipality of Sežana was split into four smaller municipalities (Divača, Komen, Hrpelje-Kozina, and Sežana).

Settlements
In addition to the municipal seat of Sežana, the municipality also includes the following settlements:

 Avber
 Bogo
 Brestovica pri Povirju
 Brje pri Koprivi
 Dane pri Sežani
 Dobravlje
 Dol pri Vogljah
 Dolenje
 Dutovlje
 Filipčje Brdo
 Godnje
 Gorenje pri Divači
 Gradišče pri Štjaku
 Gradnje
 Grahovo Brdo
 Griže
 Hribi
 Jakovce
 Kazlje
 Kopriva
 Kosovelje
 Krajna Vas
 Kregolišče
 Kreplje
 Križ
 Krtinovica
 Lipica
 Lokev
 Mahniči
 Majcni
 Merče
 Nova Vas
 Orlek
 Plešivica
 Pliskovica
 Podbreže
 Poljane pri Štjaku
 Ponikve
 Povir
 Prelože pri Lokvi
 Pristava
 Raša
 Ravnje
 Razguri
 Sela
 Selo
 Senadolice
 Šepulje
 Skopo
 Šmarje pri Sežani
 Štjak
 Stomaž
 Štorje
 Tabor
 Tomaj
 Tublje pri Komnu
 Utovlje
 Veliki Dol
 Veliko Polje
 Voglje
 Vrabče
 Vrhovlje
 Žirje

History

Slavic tribes, ancestors of modern Slovenes, first settled the area in the late 6th century AD. In the Middle Ages, the area belonged to the Duchy of Friuli and the Patriarchate of Aquileia, until it was conquered by the Counts of Gorizia in the 14th century. In 1500, it fell under the Habsburg dominion and it was included in the County of Gorizia and Gradisca.

Sights

 The Lipica Stud Farm is located in the municipality, as are several picturesque villages.
 Karst Living Museum
 Cave Vilenica
 Botanical garden in Sežana
 Pepa's Karst garden in Dutovlje
 Kosovel memorial room in Sežana and homestead in Tomaj
 Military museum in Lokev

Notable people
Notable people that were born or lived in the Municipality of Sežana include:
Primož Brezec, basketball player
Avgust Černigoj, painter
Danilo Dolci, Italian social activist
Branka Jurca, author of children literature
Taras Kermauner, literary historian and philosopher
Srečko Kosovel, poet
Josip Križaj, military pilot
Simon Kukec, entrepreneur, founder of the modern Laško Brewery 
Josip Osti, poet, essayist, and translator
Majda Širca, journalist and politician
Ciril Zlobec, poet

References

External links 

 Municipality of Sežana website
 Municipality of Sežana on Geopedia

 
Sezana
1994 establishments in Slovenia